The 2001 MAC men's basketball tournament, a part of the 2000–01 NCAA Division I men's basketball season, took place at Gund Arena in Cleveland.  Its winner received the Mid-American Conference's automatic bid to the 2001 NCAA tournament. It was a single-elimination tournament with four rounds and the three highest seeds received byes in the first round. All MAC teams were invited to participate. Central Michigan, the MAC regular season winner, received the number one seed in the tournament.

Tournament

Seeds 
 Central Michigan
 Kent State
 Marshall
 Toledo
 Ohio
 Ball State
 Bowling Green
 Miami
 Akron
 Western Michigan
 Northern Illinois
 Buffalo
 Eastern Michigan

Bracket 

* – Denotes overtime period

References 

Basketball in Cleveland
Tournament
MAC men's basketball tournament
Mid-American Conference men's basketball tournament